Faithless Lover is a 1928 American silent drama film directed by Lawrence C. Windom and starring Eugene O'Brien, Gladys Hulette and Raymond Hackett.

Cast
 Eugene O'Brien as Austin Kent 
 Gladys Hulette as Mary Callender 
 Raymond Hackett as Harry Ayres 
 Jane Jennings as Mrs. Seeton 
 James S. Barrett as Bert Rogers 
 George De Carlton as Charles Dunbar

References

Bibliography
 Munden, Kenneth White. The American Film Institute Catalog of Motion Pictures Produced in the United States, Part 1. University of California Press, 1997.

External links

1928 films
1928 drama films
Silent American drama films
American silent feature films
1920s English-language films
American black-and-white films
Films directed by Lawrence C. Windom
1920s American films